"" ("Patriotic Song"), often translated as "The Patriotic Song", is the national anthem of the Republic of Korea. It was adopted in 1948, the year the country was founded. Its music was composed in the 1930s and arranged most recently in 2018; its lyrics date back to the 1890s. The lyrics of "Aegukga" were originally set to the music of the Scottish song "Auld Lang Syne" before Ahn Eak-tai composed a unique melody specifically for it in 1936. Before the founding of South Korea, the song, set to the music of "Auld Lang Syne", was sung, as well as during Korea under Japanese rule by dissidents. The version set to the melody composed by Ahn Eak-tai was adopted as the national anthem of the Korean exile government, which existed during Korea's occupation by Japan from the early 1910s to the mid-1940s.

"Aegukga" has four verses, but on most occasions only the first one, followed by the chorus, is sung when performed publicly at events such as baseball games and football matches.

Etymology
 literally means "patriotic song". The Encyclopedia of Korean Culture defines "Aegukga" as "the song to wake up the mind to love the country". "Aegukga" in itself is differentiated from a national anthem. However, the nationally designated "Aegukga" plays the role of symbolizing the country. In general shorthand, the term aegukga refers to the national anthem of South Korea. Nevertheless, there are still more than ten other extant "Aegukgas" in South Korea.

History

Origins
In the 1890s, the previously established Joseon dynasty began to contact other countries for the first time, including the United States, United Kingdom, and Russia. The meeting with foreign countries ultimately gave rise to nationalism and patriotism, which then created several "Aegugkas.” For instance, works in 1896 includes "Aegukga" created by Na Pil-gun, Han Myung-one, and Lee Yong-mu. On November 21, 1896, scholars from the Pai Chai school sang a version of "Aegukga" at the Independence Gate cornerstone-laying ceremony. However, this song differs from the song sung by the Military Academy in 1898 and from the songs sung on the birthday of the former emperor.

However, a book from the Korean Empire era in 1900 has a record of a national anthem. It was called the "Korean Empire Aegukga,” or literally the "Anthem of the Greater Korean Empire.” That composition is commonly believed to have been written by Franz Eckert, who also arranged the Japanese national anthem. Some people contend that records documenting Franz Eckert's actions show that it was physically impossible for him to write the anthem. It is guessed that the song sung by the Paejae school was the Scottish song "Auld Lang Syne" and that the song sung by the Military Academy is a version of the British song "God Save the Queen.” 

The song attributed to Eckert was established by the military in 1902. A version of Eckert's song with different lyrics began to be officially implemented in the schools in 1904. All the schools were forced to sing the version of the song. The policy is thought of as a by-product of the Japan–Korea Treaty of 1905 and the Japan–Korea Treaty of 1907.

There are many theories concerning the writer of the currently official lyrics of "Aegukga.” It is most commonly believed that the lyrics were written for the cornerstone-laying ceremony of the Independence Gate in Seoul in 1896 by Yun Chi-ho, a Korean politician. Later, Kim Gu during the Korean government-in-exile era, said to his comrades: "In the March 1st Movement, we had the Taegeukgi and the Aegukga. Why should who wrote it be an issue?" He wrote: "The lyrics and the anthem's spirit are more important than the nature of the lyricist." Other theories name the lyricist as An Chang-ho, Choi Byung-hun, Kim In-sik, Min Yeong-hwan, or some combination of the aforementioned writers. A committee was established in 1955 by the government to determine authorship of the lyrics, on the request of the United States, but it concluded that there was not enough evidence to favor anyone.

Initially, "Aegukga" was sung to the tune of the Scottish folk song "Auld Lang Syne,” which was introduced to Korea by western missionaries. The Provisional Korean Government (1919–1945) in Shanghai, China, adopted it as their national anthem. At a ceremony celebrating the founding of South Korea on 15 August 1948, the Scottish tune was finally replaced by the Finale of "Korea Fantasia", which Ahn Eak-tai had composed in 1936, though its usage with it had been done unofficially for a few years before then. The new "Aegukga" was later adopted by the Presidential Decree of 1948 by the then South Korean President Syngman Rhee.

During official ceremonies until 1987, "Aegukga" was preceded by four ruffles and flourishes, similar to the Taiwanese practice; today the anthem is played following the playing of the presidential honours music.

Copyright
Since the composer Ahn Eak-tai died in 1965, the copyright for the music was to not expire until at least 2036. Two South Korean professional football clubs were sued by a copyright holders' group for playing this song in December 2003. However, on March 16, 2005, the composer's widow—Lolita Ahn—and her family relinquished all rights to "Aegukga" to the South Korean government. "Aegukga" has since become a public domain song.

Lyrics

Korean original

English translations

Notes

References

External links 
 Streaming audio, lyrics and info
 Republic of Korea National Anthem
 nationalanthems.info
 아이러브 KBS
 맹세문 애국가 다운로드 | 경상남도교육청
 업무 안내> 장차관직속기관> 의정관> 국가상징> 국민의례
 "Aegugka" sung to the tune of "Auld Lang Syne" 

Asian anthems
National symbols of South Korea
South Korean songs
Korean-language songs
National anthems
National anthem compositions in A major